Agatha: Coven of Chaos is an upcoming American television series created by Jac Schaeffer for the streaming service Disney+, based on the Marvel Comics character Agatha Harkness. It is intended to be part of the Marvel Cinematic Universe (MCU) produced by Marvel Studios, sharing continuity with the films of the franchise, and is a spin-off from the series WandaVision (2021). Schaeffer serves as head writer and the series' lead director. The series is also produced by 20th Television.

Kathryn Hahn reprises her role as Agatha Harkness from WandaVision, with Debra Jo Rupp also starring. Development of the series had begun by October 2021, with Schaeffer and Hahn attached, and it was formally announced the next month. The series was titled Agatha: Coven of Chaos in July 2022, with Schaeffer, Gandja Monteiro, and Rachel Goldberg set as directors in early 2023 ahead of filming. A number of additional actors from WandaVision reprise their roles in Coven of Chaos. Filming began in mid-January 2023, at Trilith Studios in Atlanta, Georgia, and will last until late April.

Agatha: Coven of Chaos is scheduled to premiere on Disney+ in late 2023 or early 2024, and will consist of nine episodes. It will be part of Phase Five of the MCU.

Cast and characters 
 Kathryn Hahn as Agatha Harkness: A powerful witch who had masqueraded as "Agnes", Wanda Maximoff and Vision's "nosy neighbor" within the fictional WandaVision sitcom.
 Debra Jo Rupp as Sharon Davis: A Westview, New Jersey resident who played "Mrs. Hart" in the fictional WandaVision sitcom.

Reprising their roles from WandaVision (2021) as Westview residents are Emma Caulfield Ford as Sarah Proctor, who played "Dottie Jones" in the WandaVision sitcom, David Payton as John Collins / "Herb", David Lengel as Sarah's husband Harold Proctor / "Phil Jones", Asif Ali as Abilash Tandon / "Norm", and Amos Glick as a pizza delivery man cast as "Dennis". Also reprising their WandaVision roles are Kate Forbes as Agatha's mother, Evanora Harkness, and Brian Brightman as the Eastview, New Jersey sheriff. Joe Locke, Aubrey Plaza, Ali Ahn, Maria Dizzia, Sasheer Zamata, Patti LuPone, Miles Gutierrez-Riley, and Okwui Okpokwasili have been cast in undisclosed roles.

Production

Development 
In August 2019, at Disney's biennial convention D23, Kathryn Hahn was announced as cast in the role of Agnes, Wanda Maximoff and Vision's neighbor in the Marvel Studios Disney+ series WandaVision (2021). That series' seventh episode revealed that "Agnes" was actually Agatha Harkness, a character from the Marvel Comics. In May, WandaVision head writer Jac Schaeffer signed a three-year overall television deal with Marvel Studios and 20th Television to develop additional projects for the studios' Disney+ content. By October 2021, a "dark comedy" spin-off from WandaVision centered on Hahn's Harkness was in early development for that service from Marvel Studios, with Schaeffer returning from WandaVision as writer and executive producer. Hahn's involvement was part of a larger deal she signed with Marvel Studios to reprise the role in additional series and films. During the Disney+ Day event the following month, the series was officially announced as Agatha: House of Harkness. It was renamed to Agatha: Coven of Chaos by July 2022. Schaeffer was revealed to also be serving as a director of the series by that November, and Gandja Monteiro was revealed to also be directing the following month. They were both confirmed in January 2023 along with Rachel Goldberg as another director, with Schaeffer directing multiple episodes. Marvel Studios' Kevin Feige, Louis D'Esposito, and Brad Winderbaum also serve as executive producers. 20th Television also produces the series.

Writing 
Peter Cameron, Cameron Squires, Laura Donney, and Megan McDonnell are working on the series, all returning from WandaVision, alongside Laura Monti, Giovanna Sarquis, and Jason Rostovsky.

Casting 
Hahn was expected to reprise her role in the series with the reveal of its development in October 2021, which was confirmed with the series' official announcement a month later. Emma Caulfield Ford revealed in October 2022 that she would reprise her role as Sarah Proctor / "Dottie Jones" from WandaVision. In November, Joe Locke, Aubrey Plaza, Ali Ahn, Maria Dizzia, and Sasheer Zamata joined the cast in undisclosed roles. Locke was reported to be the male lead of the series, which Deadline Hollywood described as a "gay teen with a dark sense of humor", while Plaza was reported to portray a villain role, and Ahn and Dizzia were reported to be portraying witch characters. Zamata was set for a recurring role. The following month, Patti LuPone joined the cast, also reportedly as a witch.

In January 2023, Debra Jo Rupp, David Payton, David Lengel, Asif Ali, Amos Glick, Brian Brightman, and Kate Forbes were revealed to be appearing in the series, reprising their respective roles from WandaVision as Sharon Davis / "Mrs. Hart", John Collins / "Herb", Harold Proctor / "Phil Jones", Abilash Tandon / "Norm", a pizza delivery man cast as "Dennis", the Eastview, New Jersey sheriff, and Agatha's mother Evanora Harkness. Miles Gutierrez-Riley and Okwui Okpokwasili were also cast in the series.

Filming 
Principal photography began on January 17, 2023, at Trilith Studios in Atlanta, Georgia, with Schaeffer, Monteiro, and Goldberg directing episodes of the series. Caleb Heymann served as the cinematographer. The series is filmed under the working title My Pretty. It is expected to last until April 28, 2023.

Music 
In January 2023, Hahn hinted at the inclusion of songs in the series, much like the original songs featured in WandaVision such as "Agatha All Along".

Release 
Agatha: Coven of Chaos is scheduled to premiere on Disney+ in late 2023 or early 2024, and will consist of nine episodes. By February 2023, amid Disney and Marvel Studios re-evaluating their content output, Secret Invasion and the second season of Loki were believed to be the only "sure bets" to debut in 2023. It will be part of Phase Five of the MCU.

References

External links 
  at Marvel.com
 

2020s American television series
2020s American black comedy television series
2020s American superhero comedy television series

American television spin-offs
Disney+ original programming
English-language television shows
Marvel Cinematic Universe: Phase Five television series
Television series about witchcraft
Television series by 20th Century Fox Television
Television series by Marvel Studios
Television shows based on works by Jack Kirby
Television shows based on works by Stan Lee
Television shows filmed in Atlanta
Upcoming television series
WandaVision
Works by Jac Schaeffer